The Sandu Cabinet was a Cabinet of Moldova, led by Maia Sandu.

History

It was inaugurated on 8 June 2019, in the middle of the 2019 Moldovan constitutional crisis when the Constitutional Court of Moldova declared unconstitutional her designation for this position as well as the appointment of the Government of the Republic of Moldova. However on 15 June 2019, the Constitutional Court revised and repealed its previous decisions declaring the Sandu Cabinet to have been constitutionally created. It was ousted in a motion of no confidence in the Parliament of Moldova on 12 November that same year and subsequently replaced by a government headed by Ion Chicu. The reason for the government collapse was the draft law assumed by the government to delegate a part of its plenary powers to the Prime Minister to propose a "short list" with the candidates for Prosecutor General's position. President Igor Dodon mentioned that by assuming this powers by Government,  the ACUM bloc violated the agreement made with the PSRM which clearly stipulated that the applicants for the position of Prosecutor General are selected by an expert committee.

Composition 

The Başkan (Governor) of Gagauzia is elected by universal, equal, direct, secret and free suffrage on an alternative basis for a term of 4 years. One and the same person can be a governor for no more than two consecutive terms. The Başkan of Gagauzia is confirmed as a member of the Moldovan government by a decree of the President of Moldova.

References

External links
 Cabinet of Ministers

 

Moldova cabinets
Coalition governments
2019 establishments in Moldova
Cabinets established in 2019